José Luis Martínez Rodríguez (1918 in Atoyac, Jalisco) was a Mexican academic, diplomat, essayist, historian, bibliographer and editor. He was the director of the Fondo de Cultura Económica from 1977 to 1982 and professor of literature with the Faculty of Philosophy and Letters at the National Autonomous University of Mexico.

Career
He became an Academic Numerary of the Academia Mexicana de la Lengua in 1960. From 1980 to 2002 he was the Director and, in 2003, was named Honorary Director in perpetuity. He was also a numerary at the Academia Mexicana de la Historia (Chair 28), beginning in 1993, and a corresponding member of the Academia Peruana de la Lengua and the Academia Dominicana de la Lengua. From 1965 to 1970 he was Director general of the Instituto Nacional de Bellas Artes.

In addition to his academic posts, he served as Mexico's representative at UNESCO for the year 1963-64 and was ambassador to Greece from 1971 to 1974.

Among the many awards and honors he has received are the National Prize for Arts and Sciences (Premio Nacional de Ciencias y Artes) for Literature and Linguistics, the Alfonso Reyes International Prize (Premio Internacional Alfonso Reyes), the Menéndez Pelayo International Prize, the Spanish Civil Order of Alfonso X, the Wise and the French Legion of Honor. In 1967, he became a Commander of the Order of Merit of the Italian Republic.

His personal library was one of the largest in Mexico; it has been preserved in the National Library.

Director of the Fondo de Cultura Económica
During his leadership of the Fondo de Cultura Económica, over 700 new titles were published and he created the Revistas Literarias Mexicanas Modernas collection, which reprinted, in facsimile editions, the most important literary magazines published in Mexico during the first half of the twentieth century. He also focused on rebuilding the general catalog by reissuing a total of 1084 titles of continuing cultural significance.

Selected works
America Antigua: Nahua, Mayas, Quechuas, Otras Culturas, (El Mundo Antiguo, VI), Secretaria de Educacion Publica (1976) 
El Trato con Escritores y Otros Estudios, Universidad Autonoma Metropolitana (1992) 
La Expresión Nacional: Letras Mexicanas del Siglo XIX, Consejo Nacional para la Cultura y las Artes (1993) 
La Literatura Mexicana del Siglo XX, Consejo Nacional para la Cultura y las Artes (1995) 
Pasajeros de Indias, Viajes Transatlánticos en el Siglo XVI, Alianza (1998) 
Bibliofilia. (Autobiográfico), FCE (2000) 
Cruzar el Atlántico, FCE (2004) 
Nezahualcóyotl: Vida y Obra, FCE (2006) 
Hernán Cortés, FCE (2006)

References

Further reading
Díaz Arciniegas, Víctor, Historia de la Casa. Fondo de Cultura Económica (1934–1994), FCE  (1997) 

1918 births
2007 deaths
People from Jalisco
20th-century Mexican historians
Academic staff of the National Autonomous University of Mexico
Mexican diplomats
Presidents of the Chamber of Deputies (Mexico)
Recipients of the Civil Order of Alfonso X, the Wise
Recipients of the Legion of Honour
Commanders of the Order of Merit of the Italian Republic